Nemaha Valley Schools (ID#49-0501-000) was a school district in Nebraska.

The district's service area included Cook, Burr, Lorton, and Talmage.

History

Charles Finley served as superintendent until June 30, 1972.

In 1992 the Burr Public School District dissolved, with Nemaha Valley taking some of the territory.

In 1993 the Spring Creek Public School District dissolved, with Nemaha Valley taking some of the territory.

Gary Anderson served as principal until his 2001 resignation.

The voters allowed for increased taxes with a levy override voted in November 2005. However, state aid declined to its smallest number in 2007.

In the 2006-2007 school year, the enrollment count was 192, and there were to be about 30 fewer students for a 2007-2008 school year. In 2007 the district agreed to merge with Tecumseh Public Schools.

Effective May 31, 2007, Nemaha Valley merged into Johnson County Central Public Schools.

Student programs
Nemaha Valley, by 2007, had a Future Farmers of America program.

See also
 List of school districts in Nebraska

References

External links
 Nemaha Valley High School Chapter, Future Business Leaders of America
Former school districts in the United States
School districts in Nebraska
Johnson County, Nebraska
Education in Otoe County, Nebraska